Enrollment Management is a term that is used frequently in higher education to describe well-planned strategies and tactics to shape the enrollment of an institution and meet established goals.  Plainly stated, enrollment management is an organizational concept and a systematic set of activities designed to enable educational institutions to exert more influence over their student enrollments. 

Such practices often include marketing, admission policies, retention programs, and financial aid awarding. Strategies and tactics are informed by collection, analysis, and use of data to project successful outcomes. Activities that produce measurable improvements in yields are continued and/or expanded, while those activities that do not are discontinued or restructured. Competitive efforts to recruit students is a common emphasis of enrollment managers.

The numbers of universities and colleges instituting offices of "enrollment management" have increased in recent years. These offices serve to provide direction and coordination of efforts of multiple offices such as admissions, financial aid, registration, and other student services. Often these offices are part of an enrollment management division.

Some of the typical aims of enrollment management include:

 Improving yields at inquiry, application, and enrollment stages. 
 Increasing net revenue, usually by improving the proportion of entering students capable of paying most or all of unsubsidized tuition ("full-pays") 
 Increasing demographic diversity 
 Improving retention rates 
 Increasing applicant pools

According to Matthew Quirk :
More-advanced enrollment managers also tend to focus as much on retaining admitted students as on deciding whom to recruit and accept. They smooth out administrative hassles, guarantee at-risk students the advising and academic help they need, and ensure that the different parts of the university's bureaucracy work together to get students out the door with a degree.

See also 
Strategic Enrollment Management
Graduate enrollment management
Enrollment Management Blog

Notes
  Answers.com "Enrollment Management in Higher Education"
  ibid
  Matthew Quirk, 2005 The Best Class Money Can Buy, The Atlantic Monthly, Nov. 2005
  CSCSR "Parkland College Enrollment Management Model" 
  Matthew Quirk, op. cit.

Educational administration